St. Stephen's Armenian Apostolic Church, also known as Soorp Stepanos Church, is an Armenian Apostolic church in Watertown, Massachusetts.

St. Stephen’s Armenian Apostolic Church is located in the heart of the Armenian community in Watertown, MA, the largest Armenian community on the east coast. Its jurisdiction falls under the Eastern Prelacy of the Armenian Apostolic Church, and the Holy See of Cilicia.

There is a bilingual school next to the church named St. Stephen's Armenian Elementary School.

Gallery

References

External links
St. Stephen's Armenian Apostolic Church (Watertown, MA) on Facebook

Armenian Apostolic churches in the United States
Armenian-American culture in Massachusetts
Churches in Middlesex County, Massachusetts
Buildings and structures in Watertown, Massachusetts